is a passenger railway station located in the city of Takamatsu, Kagawa Prefecture, Japan. It is operated by JR Shikoku and has the station number "Y04".

Lines
The station is served by the JR Shikoku Yosan Line and is located 11.9 km from the beginning of the line at Takamatsu. Yosan line local, Rapid Sunport, and Nanpū Relay services stop at the station. These trains also stop at Kokubu.

Layout
Kokubu Station consists of two opposed side platforms serving two tracks. A concrete station building serve as a waiting room. Access to the opposite platform is by means of a footbridge. The station is unstaffed but a "Tickets Corner" (a small shelter housing an automatic ticket vending machine) is provided. In addition there is a siding serving a disused freight platform.

Adjacent stations

History
After the railway as nationalized on 1 December 1906, Japanese Government Railways (JGR) took over the station and operated it as part of the Sanuki Line (later the Sanyo and then the Yosan Main Line). With the privatization of Japanese National Railways (JNR, the successor of JGR) on 1 April 1987, control of the station passed to JR Shikoku.

Surrounding area
Kagawa Prefectural Youth Center
Sanuki Kokubun-ji Ruins

See also
 List of railway stations in Japan

References

External links

Station timetable

Railway stations in Takamatsu
Railway stations in Japan opened in 1897